Granvinsvatnet is a lake in the Granvin area of Voss Municipality in Vestland county, Norway.  The  lake sits just north of the village of Eide.

The Norwegian National Road 13 exits the Tunsberg Tunnel just northwest of the lake and then runs along the northern and eastern shores of the lake before entering the Vallavik Tunnel just off the southeastern tip of the lake.  The Joberg Tunnel along the northern part of this lake opened in September 2017.  The old Hardanger Line railway used to run along the west side of the lake.  Granvin Church lies along the eastern shore of the lake.

See also
List of lakes in Norway

References

Lakes of Vestland
Voss